Andrew Cowper Lawson (July 25, 1861 – June 16, 1952) was a Scots-Canadian geologist who became professor of geology at the University of California, Berkeley.  He was the editor and co-author of the 1908 report on the 1906 San Francisco earthquake which became known as the "Lawson Report".  He was also the first person to identify and name the San Andreas Fault in 1895, and after the 1906 quake, the first to delineate the entire length of the San Andreas Fault which previously had been noted only in the San Francisco Bay Area.  He also named the Franciscan Complex after the Franciscan Order of the Catholic church whose missions used conscripted Native American labor to mine limestone in these areas.

Biography
Lawson was born on July 25, 1861, in Anstruther, Scotland.  He moved to Hamilton, Ontario, Canada with his parents at age six.  In 1883, he received his B.A. degree in natural science from the University of Toronto.  He worked for the Geological Survey of Canada while pursuing his graduate degrees.  He received his M.A. from the University of Toronto in 1885, and his Ph.D. from Johns Hopkins University in 1888.

In 1890, he left the Geological Survey of Canada to work as a consulting geologist in Vancouver. In October of the same year, he accepted a position as Assistant Professor of Mineralogy and Geology at the University of California in Berkeley.  He became a full professor in 1892, and a Professor Emeritus from 1928 to his death on June 16, 1952.

Lawson was president of the Geological Society of America in 1926.

He was a consulting geologist for the construction of the Golden Gate Bridge in the 1930s.

His home in the La Loma Park area of the Berkeley Hills in Berkeley, California, now called the "Lawson House", was especially designed for him by noted architect Bernard Maybeck to withstand earthquakes.  The house is an officially designated local landmark.

The mineral Lawsonite is named for him, as is the Lawson Adit, originally a mining construction research tunnel on UC Berkeley's campus.  During the Cold War, it was used to house special equipment to monitor Soviet nuclear tests.  It is currently used to house seismological instruments.

Lawson Hill (elev. 1,128 feet), located west of the Briones Hills in Contra Costa County, California, is named for him.

References 

 The California Earthquake of April 18, 1906: Report of the State Earthquake Investigation Commission, Andrew C. Lawson, chairman, Carnegie Institution of Washington Publication 87, 2 vols. (1908) – Available online at this USGS webpage.

External links
 
 UC Berkeley – Lawson Biography
 Guide to the Andrew C. Lawson Papers at The Bancroft Library
 The Lawson House
 Mary K. Miller: '' Exploratorium
 Great Scots: Lawson
National Academy of Sciences Biographical Memoir

1861 births
1952 deaths
Scottish geologists
Scottish emigrants to Canada
Canadian emigrants to the United States
Geological Survey of Canada personnel
Johns Hopkins University alumni
University of Toronto alumni
University of California, Berkeley faculty
Penrose Medal winners
People from Anstruther
Writers from Berkeley, California
Scientists from the San Francisco Bay Area
1906 San Francisco earthquake
Presidents of the Geological Society of America
Golden Gate Bridge